Chopper Dave may refer to:
 a minor character in the animated TV series Sealab 2021
 a minor character in the TV series Frasier